Glenea centralis is a species of beetle in the family Cerambycidae. It was described by Stephan von Breuning in 1956. It contains the varietas Glenea centralis var. ruficra.

References

centralis
Beetles described in 1956